Manakau is a mountain peak in the Canterbury region of New Zealand's South Island. At 2,608 metres, it is the highest peak of the Seaward Kaikoura Range.

Five routes to the summit have been described, including the popular one from Barratts Bivvy (however the bivvy itself was destroyed during 2016 Kaikōura earthquake).

Water from the mountain feeds the Waiau Toa / Clarence, Hapuku and Kowhai Rivers.

See also
 List of mountains of New Zealand by height
 List of Ultras of Oceania

References

Kaikōura District
Mountains of Canterbury, New Zealand